The 2015 Bayelsa State gubernatorial election occurred in Nigeria on December 5, 2015. The PDP nominee Henry Seriake Dickson won the election, defeating Timipre Sylva of the APC.

Henry Seriake Dickson emerged PDP as the sole candidate. He picked Gboribiogha John Jonah as his running mate. Timipre Sylva was the APC candidate with Wilberforce Titus Igiri as his running mate.

Electoral system
The Governor of Bayelsa State is elected using the plurality voting system.

Primary election

PDP primary
The PDP primary election was held on September 24, 2015. Henry Seriake Dickson emerged PDP flag bearer after polling 447 votes as the sole candidate. Henry Seriake Dickson picked Gboribiogha John Jonah as his running mate.

APC primary
The APC primary election was held on September 30, 2015. Timipre Sylva emerged the party's flag bearer after polling 981 votes against 18 other candidates. His closest rival, Godknows Powel, who polled 39 votes while Wallman Agoriba came third with 28 votes. Timipre Sylva picked Wilberforce Titus Igiri as his running mate.

Results
A total number of 20 candidates registered with the Independent National Electoral Commission to contest in the election.

The total number of registered voters in the state was 654,493, while 242,114 voters were accredited. Total number of valid votes was 225,520. Rejected votes were 6,647.

Candidates and their parties
  Ken Gbahligha Gbalikuma, ACPN
	Chief Osain Dumome, ADC
 Abbey E.G Daniel, APA
 Timipre Marlin Sylva,	APC
 Hon. Deacon Christopher Fullpower Enai, APGA
 Eneyi Gideon Roloand Zidougha, CPP
 Henry Pereokosifa Apeli, DPC
 	Pius Abudou Waritimi,	DPP
	Major Newline Dengeyifa Sam Yaudugagha, ID
	Isaac Suoyo Nathan	KOWA
 Ogoriba Timiniderimo Kaiser, LP
	Ekubo Prince Tari, MPPP
	Namatebe Inko, NNPP
	Ere Hendrix Obragono, PDC
	Moses Ebipadou Siliko Siasia,	PDM
	Dickson, Henry Seriake, PDP
	Alexander Peretu, PPA
	Enu Otonye, PPN
	Joy Prince Oniekpe, SDP
	Willams Woyinkuro Berezi, UPP

References 

Bayelsa State gubernatorial elections
Bayelsa State
Bayelsa State gubernatorial election
gubernatorial